Burrum Heads is a coastal town and locality in the Fraser Coast Region, Queensland, Australia.

Geography 
The waters of Hervey Bay form the north-eastern and eastern boundary. The Burrum River forms the western, north-western and northern boundaries, while Beelbi Creek forms the south-eastern boundary.

History 
The town was originally called Traviston after the original owner Robert Travis. It was renamed Burrum Heads in 1960, which takes its name from the Burrum River, which in turn is an word in the Kabi language meaning rocks interrupting river flow.

The Burrum Heads public library opened in 1987 and underwent a major refurbishment in 2013.  

In December 1991, Hervey Bay Uniting Church relocated a timber church building to Burrum Heads to be used for Uniting Church services, but also available for use by other denominations.

Amenities 
The Fraser Coast Regional Council operates a public library at 22 Burrum Heads Road. The library has public Wi-Fi available.

Burrum Heads Christian Community Church is at 16 Burrum Heads Road (corner Howard Street). It is part of the Hervey Bay Uniting Church. It is also used for services by the Burrum Heads Anglican Church and the St Peter the Fisherman Catholic Community.

There are a number of parks in the area:

 Lions Park
 Traviston Park

References

External links 

 
 

Towns in Queensland
Fraser Coast Region
Coastline of Queensland
Localities in Queensland